William Hooper (23 July 1824 – 5 January 1899) was a political figure in Prince Edward Island. He represented 2nd Kings in the Legislative Assembly of Prince Edward Island from 1870 to 1873 and from 1879 to 1886 as a Liberal member.

He was born in Northleigh, Devonshire, England, the son of Joseph Hooper, and educated in Honiton. In 1847, he married Louisa Maria Esparanca. Hooper served in the British Commissariat in Bermuda from 1847 to 1850, when he resigned and settled in Prince Edward Island. He was chairman of the board of Railway Appraisers from 1872 to 1873.

External links 

The Canadian parliamentary companion, 1883 AJ Gemmill
The Canadian parliamentary companion and annual register, 1880, CH Mackintosh

1824 births
1899 deaths
People from East Devon District
English emigrants to pre-Confederation Prince Edward Island
Prince Edward Island Liberal Party MLAs